Ennepetal is a town in the district of Ennepe-Ruhr-Kreis, in North Rhine-Westphalia, Germany. It was created in 1949 out of the former municipalities Milspe and Voerde. It was named after the river Ennepe, which flows through the municipality.

The town was featured in the headlines when on April 12, 2005, a hostage taker snatched several school children from a school bus and took them as hostages, see Ennepetal hostage taking.

Division of the town

Ennepetal is divided into nine quarters (Ortsteile), which resemble former towns and villages. The population is shown as of 10 June 2015:
 Altenvoerde (3663)
 Bülbringen/Oberbauer (1470)
 Büttenberg (3689)
 Hasperbach (1208)
 Königsfeld (1090)
 Milspe (9776)
 Oelkinghausen (573)
 Rüggeberg (1482)
 Voerde (7438)

Politics
The current mayor of Ennepetal is independent politician Imke Heymann. She was first elected in 2015 with the endorsement of the CDU, The Greens, Free Voters, and FDP. In the most recent mayoral election was held on 13 September 2020, Heymann was re-elected with 70.3% of votes with the backing of the SPD and CDU. She was opposed by Sotirios Kostas (18.2%) and Cornelia Born-Maijer (11.5%), who both ran as independents.

Local council 

The Ennepetal municipal council governs the city alongside the Mayor. The most recent council election was held on 13 September 2020, and the results were as follows:

! colspan=2| Party
! Votes
! %
! +/-
! Seats
! +/-
|-
| bgcolor=| 
| align=left| Social Democratic Party (SPD)
| 3,792
| 31.5
|  7.1
| 11
|  5
|-
| bgcolor=| 
| align=left| Christian Democratic Union (CDU)
| 3,556
| 29.5
|  3.3
| 11
| ±0
|-
| bgcolor=| 
| align=left| Alliance 90/The Greens (Grüne)
| 2,252
| 18.7
|  8.9
| 7
|  3
|-
| bgcolor=| 
| align=left| Free Democratic Party (FDP)
| 1,089
| 9.0
|  2.9
| 3
|  1
|-
| bgcolor=| 
| align=left| Free Voters Ennepetal (FWE)
| 780
| 6.5
|  2.3
| 2
|  2
|-
| bgcolor=| 
| align=left| The Left (Die Linke)
| 572
| 4.8
|  0.8
| 2
| ±0
|-
! colspan=2| Valid votes
! 12,041
! 98.0
! 
! 
! 
|-
! colspan=2| Invalid votes
! 248
! 2.0
! 
! 
! 
|-
! colspan=2| Total
! 12,289
! 100.0
! 
! 36
!  6
|-
! colspan=2| Electorate/voter turnout
! 24,726
! 49.7
! 
! 
! 
|-
| colspan=7| Source: City of Ennepetal
|}

Twin towns – sister cities

Ennepetal is twinned with:
 Vilvoorde, Belgium

Transport
The Ennepetal (Gevelsberg) station on the Wuppertal–Dortmund railway is served by regional trains.

The town also had a station named "Voerde" on the Kleinbahn Haspe-Voerde-Breckerfeld, which in former times was the longest streetcar in Germany. Today, the former track is being used as a walk and bicycle way, connecting the Ruhr area to the nearby Sauerland.

Notable places
The Klutert Cave is one of the largest natural caves of Germany with a length of over 5 km.

Economy 
 dormakaba
 febi - Ferdinand Bilstein
 ABC - Altenloh Brinck & Co (screws)
 Dahlhaus Leuchten, GmbH
 Ernst Mager KG (screws)

Notable people

Sons and daughters of the town
 Karl-Heinz Peters (1903–1990), film actor

People who are connected to Ennepetal

 Dirk Rauin (born 1957), handball player and coach
 Ralf Waldmann (born 1966), motorcycle racing driver

References

External links 

  
 Kluterthöhle 

Ennepe-Ruhr-Kreis